Aungmyethazan Township (also Aungmyethasan Township) is the northernmost (and city centre core) township of Mandalay, Myanmar. The township is bounded by the Ayeyarwady river in the west, Patheingyi Township in the east, Chanayethazan Township in the south. Aungmyethazan is home to many of city's famous sites, including the Mandalay Palace and the Mandalay Hill.

Notable places
 Atumashi Monastery
 Kuthodaw Pagoda
 Kyauktawgyi Buddha Temple
 Mandalay Hill
 Mandalay Palace
 Mandalay Workers' Hospital
 Nandawun Park
 Man Thida Park
 University of Traditional Medicine, Mandalay
 Yadanabon Zoological Gardens (Mandalay Zoo)
 Mandalay Central Prison

References

Townships of Mandalay
Townships of Mandalay Region
Mandalay